Paradise, Hawaiian Style is the thirteenth soundtrack album by American singer and musician Elvis Presley, released by RCA Victor in mono and stereo, LPM/LSP 3643, in June 1966. It is the soundtrack to the 1966 film of the same name starring Presley. Recording sessions took place at Radio Recorders in Hollywood, California, on July 26 and 27, and August 2, 1965. It peaked at number 15 on the Top LP's chart.

Background
Presley found himself in 1965 recording soundtrack albums for films that were almost a year away from release — gone were the days when the turnaround time from the final session for Elvis Is Back! to its arrival in the shops was less than one week. While working on this album, his most recent film in the theaters was Tickle Me, and Presley had completed three more movies since then. With titles like "A Dog's Life" and "Queenie Wahine's Papaya" he openly ridiculed the material, wasting time before finally approaching the microphone to do the job. He begrudgingly accepted songs given him that he would have rejected outright years earlier. He always finished the work, but in essence Presley had become a hired hand in his own career. Popular music, and particularly Rock n' Roll, was in a state of total change as an art form and Presley was 'lost in Hollywood'.

Content
No singles were issued from songs on Paradise, Hawaiian Style. Ten songs were recorded at the sessions for the soundtrack, but only nine were used in the film. The omitted song, "Sand Castles," was included on the album to bring the running order to ten tracks. Sales for the album were under 250,000, a new low for Presley's LP catalogue. The good news was the single issued in June 1966 two days before the album, the 1945 Victor Young standard "Love Letters" backed with Clyde McPhatter's 1958 rhythm and blues hit "Come What May". It made a respectable number 19 on the Billboard Hot 100, and at least reflected Presley's actual tastes away from obligations to the soundtrack recordings. It was also his first contemporary record release in three years since "(You're the) Devil in Disguise" in June 1963, arriving in stores less than two weeks after it was recorded.

Reissues
In 2004 Paradise, Hawaiian Style was reissued on the Follow That Dream label in a special edition that contained the original album tracks along with numerous alternate takes.

Track listing

Original release

2004 Follow That Dream CD reissue

Personnel

 Elvis Presley – vocals
 The Jordanaires – backing vocals
 The Mello Men – backing vocals (on "Drums Of The Islands")
 Bernal Lewis – steel guitar
 Scotty Moore – electric guitar
 Barney Kessel – electric guitar
 Charlie McCoy – acoustic guitar
 Howard Roberts – electric guitar ("Sand Castles")
Allan Hendrickson – electric guitar ("Sand Castles")
 Larry Muhoberac – piano
 Ray Siegel – double bass
 Keith Mitchell – bass guitar ("Sand Castles")
 D.J. Fontana – drums
Hal Blaine – drums
 Milt Holland – drums
 Victor Feldman – drums ("Sand Castles")

Charts
Album

References

External links

1966 soundtrack albums
Elvis Presley soundtracks
RCA Records soundtracks
Musical film soundtracks
Comedy film soundtracks

no:Datin'